York is an unincorporated community in Clark County, Illinois, United States. York is located along the Wabash River in far southeast Clark County.

References

Unincorporated communities in Clark County, Illinois
Unincorporated communities in Illinois